
This is a list of players who graduated from the Nationwide Tour in 2008. The top 25 players on the Nationwide Tour's money list in 2008 earned their PGA Tour card for 2009.

*PGA Tour rookie for 2009. 
T = Tied 
Green background indicates the player retained his PGA Tour card for 2010 (finished inside the top 125). 
Yellow background indicates the player did not retain his PGA Tour card for 2010, but retained conditional status (finished between 126 and 150). 
Red background indicates the player did not retain his PGA Tour card for 2010 (finished outside the top 150).

Runners-up on the PGA Tour in 2009

See also
2008 PGA Tour Qualifying School graduates

References
All information from here  and here , individual player profiles and golfstats.com.
Money list
Player profiles

Korn Ferry Tour
PGA Tour
Nationwide Tour Graduates
Nationwide Tour Graduates